The Thrasher incident, as it became known in the US media, nearly became the start of America's involvement in World War I. On March 28, 1915, the British steamship  was torpedoed and sunk by German U-boat . In the incident, 104 people were killed, including one American passenger, Leon Chester Thrasher, a 31-year-old mining engineer from Massachusetts.

Background 
On 4 Feb. 1915, the German Admiralty declared a war zone around Britain, with all ships in that zone to be targeted. Germany's 30 submarines then began sinking all vessels, whether belligerent or neutral. Though they had secret orders to spare American ships, a freighter and a tanker were sunk. Britain responded by tightening its blockade of Germany that included food.

The British Admiralty instructed ships to steer away or to ram any submarine that they encountered. They were not to zigzag.

The American government, led by US President Woodrow Wilson and US Secretary of State William Jennings Bryan, responded with a protest to the German government on 10 February. Wilson and Bryan called the German intention "an act so unprecedented in naval warfare" and that the US would hold the Germans to "a strict accountability for such acts of their naval authorities."

On 27 March 1915, the Falaba of the Elder Dempster Lines left Liverpool for West Africa. She was operating with a crew of 95 and carried 147 passengers, one of whom was the American mining engineer Leon Chester Thrasher (sometimes spelled Thresher). In addition, the ship was carrying 13 tons of cartridges and gunpowder.

Sinking 
On 28 March, at 1140, the conning tower of U-28, commanded by Kapitänleutnant Georg-Günther von Forstner, was sighted by Chief Officer Walter Baxter. Captain Frederick Davies then ordered the Falaba to steer away at maximum speed. However, Davies then ordered them to stop and to send two wireless messages of their predicament, the result of the Germans warning the ship to "stop or I will fire." Forstner then ordered Davies to abandon the ship, as it was to be sunk. The evacuation was disorganized, which resulted in several casualties. A torpedo amidships sank the ship quickly.

One of the 104 persons to die in the incident was Leon Thrasher, who was the first American to die from the action of a German submarine.

Aftermath 
Though Wilson thought international law had been violated, Bryan wondered "whether an American citizen can, by putting his business above his regard for his country, assume for his own advantage unnecessary risks and thus involve his country in international complications." The sinking of the Lusitania prompted the Americans to send a diplomatic note to the Germans asking for an apology and reparations for both ships. The note included a warning that the US would take "any necessary act in sustaining the rights of its citizens or in safeguarding the sacred duties of international law."

The Gore-McLemore resolution, introduced by two southern members of Congress directed the President to warn Americans against traveling aboard foreign ships of belligerent nations, and even proposed confiscating passports of citizens who failed to comply. In keeping with that sentiment, and supporting the isolationist views of his constituents, Representative Frank Park of Georgia affirmed that he opposed any policy that would "hurl the sons of the South to death and destruction because some fool, or idiot, or nonpatriotic rascal" chose to sail on a "belligerent armed vessel".

After persistent requests by Bryan, documents detailing witness statements from the sinking of Falaba offered proof that the captain of U-28 gave adequate warnings and time for Falaba to offload passengers. Instead, the crew of Falaba had used that time to radio the position of the submarine to nearby armed British patrol ships. As the warship approached, the submarine fired at the last minute and detonated nearly thirteen tons of contraband high explosives in Falabas cargo. 

Thrasher's remains washed ashore on Ireland's coast on July 11, 1915, after it had been in the water for 106 days. Initially, authorities mistook him for a  victim and designated him Body No. 248.

After reviewing Lord Mersey's investigation of the incident, Alastair Walker commented that "had the crew been well organized and the passengers well led, all of those on the ship could have been safely evacuated before the torpedo was fired. The sinking of the ship was down to von Forstner and U-28; responsibility for the loss of life, however lay with Elder, Dempster, their Marine Superintendent and his brother-in-law Fred Davies."

References

Sources
American Journal of International Law, Vol. 9, No. 2 (April 1915), pp. 503–513.
 Atlantic Liners, The Pre-Lusitania Sinkings, J. Kent Layton, 2004.
 Colin Simpson, The Lusitania (Boston; Toronto: Little Brown, c1972).

External links 
 University of San Diego WWI Timeline.
 "U.S. Citizen is Lost on Torpedoed Ship", Evening Star. (Washington, D.C.), 31 March 1915. Chronicling America: Historic American Newspapers. Library of Congress. 
 "American Lost When Submarine Torpedoed Ship", New-York Tribune. (New York [N.Y.]), 31 March 1915. Chronicling America: Historic American Newspapers. Library of Congress.
 "American is Lost on Boat Sunk in Zone", Rock Island Argus. (Rock Island, Ill.), 31 March 1915. Chronicling America: Historic American Newspapers. Library of Congress.

Maritime incidents in 1915
1915 in the United States
1915 in the United Kingdom
United States in World War I